Ciarán Whelan (born 28 February 1976 in Raheny, County Dublin) is a Gaelic footballer who plays for the Raheny club and, formerly, for the Dublin county team. He is right-footed but can kick with both feet and usually plays in midfield. He was a member of the Dublin squad between 1996 and 2009. He never won an all Ireland and is to this day known as possibly one of the best high-fielders in the country.

All-Ireland Senior Football Championship
He collected six Leinster Senior Football Championship medals coming in 2002,2005 and 2006 and 2007, 2008 and 2009. He finished the 2005 Leinster and All-Ireland Championships with a total of three points compared to the one goal and ten points he scored in the league. He captained the Dublin side in 2003 and 2004. He also won an All Star in 1999 and has been nominated many times, his last nomination coming in 2005 the same year in which he captained Leinster in the Railway Cup. He has started the 2006 Championship well, with a solid performance against Longford and then a far better performance against Laois, a game in which he dominated midfield. He played a 'man of the match' performance against Offaly in the Leinster final and set up Jason Sherlock for the winning goal. Unfortunately, Whelan suffered an eye injury against Westmeath which forced him off and also affected him in the defeat to Mayo. Whelan showed his reckless side with a poor tackle on Mayo's Ronan McGarrity which forced McGarrity off. He was nominated for an all-star for his 2006 performances in Midfield with Dublin.

Whelan was awarded his second all-star in October 2007 at the Vodafone all-stars awards ceremony. Ciaran's best point from play in Croke Park was against Kildare in the Leinster Final of 2000. With Dublin leading by 4 points in the first half, Whelan made a surging run of 30 metres and ploughed a beautiful point off his left (weaker) side from 45 metres in to the Hill 16 end. Dublin would ultimately self-destruct in the second half of that final. Another marvellous point came a year later in Thurles against Kerry in the first quarter final game. In the second half Dublin were down by 2 points and Whelan made a trademark surge down the touchline and made a brilliant point from 30-metre range right on the side line. This point was scored in the Killinan end of the ground with Dublin supporters situated here. He announced his retirement from inter-county football on 1 September 2009.

Lately, Whelan has become a Gaelic football pundit for RTÉ's The Sunday Game.

Championship appearances

National Football League
Whelan received a suspension of eight weeks in the controversial 2006 National League clash between Dublin and Tyrone. A game which resulted in disciplinary action against 9 players involved in the game. Whelan, Bryan Cullen, Kevin Bonner and Alan Brogan were all exonerated from all charges along with the Tyrone trio of Kevin Hughes, Michael McGee and Owen Mulligan. The official reason given for the exoneration was stated as 'a technicality'.

He finished the 2006 National Football League with a single point.

Railway Cup
Whelan was captain on the winning side for Leinster against Ulster in the 2005 Railway Cup which was played in Parnell Park. Leinster claimed the Martin Donnelly Cup for the 28th time.

Club football
Whelan plays his club football for Raheny, a Dublin AFL Division 1 side on the northside of County Dublin. Whelan played in the side that won the 2007 Division 2 playoff to win participation in Division 1 for the 2008 season.

International rules football
Whelan helped Ireland defeat Australia in the 1999 International Rules Series by scoring a Goal and an Over. He also played in the 2001 International Rules Series.

References

1977 births
Living people
Dublin inter-county Gaelic footballers
Gaelic games writers and broadcasters
Irish international rules football players
Raheny GAA footballers